Marukai Corporation U.S.A. is an American offshoot chain of retail markets that imports and sells Japanese goods in American cities started by the Osaka, Japan-based . Unlike other Japanese supermarkets, which may carry non-Japanese products based on local diversity, Marukai has Hawaiian products as a core focus in addition to Japanese in all its stores. Its headquarters are in Gardena, California, in Greater Los Angeles.

History
The company was founded in 1965 by Richard and Hidejiro Matsu, sons of the founder of parent company Marukai Trading. In 1975, the company established Marukai Los Angeles. By 1980, it changed to its current name and opened Marukai Wholesale Mart in Gardena, California. The company began to emphasize membership-based retail shopping.

In 1999, the company opened its first 98cent Plus Store carrying Daiso products, before Daiso had its own stores in US. The company has since expanded to 11 locations in California with over 400 employees in California. These stores sell Japanese food and household items.

In 2013, Don Quijote purchased 100 percent of Marukai stock. In 2015, Marukai started operating stores under the name Tokyo Central.

Locations

Marukai
Marukai Market
 Cupertino, California
 Little Tokyo, Los Angeles, California
 West Los Angeles, California
 San Diego, California
 Marukai Wholesale Mart
 Honolulu, Hawaii 
 Kalihi
 Ward Village (closed September 30, 2017)
Tokyo Central
 Tokyo Central & Main
 Gardena, California
 San Diego, California
 Tokyo Central Specialty Market
 Gardena, California
 Costa Mesa, California
 Torrance, California
 West Covina, California
 Yorba Linda, California

Controversy
On March 9, 2006, Marukai agreed to pay a $52,000 fine to the United States Environmental Protection Agency for selling 11 unregistered Japanese pesticide products.

In 2011, the company was fined $222,030 for selling and distributing unregistered pesticides and mislabeled pesticide devices, violations that were found in 2008.

See also

 Mitsuwa Marketplace
 99 Ranch Market
 H Mart
 Nijiya Market

References

External links

Official Marukai Corporation website
Online shopping website
Marukai Hawaii

Japanese supermarkets
Supermarkets of the United States
Companies based in Los Angeles County, California
Gardena, California
American companies established in 1965
Retail companies established in 1965
1965 establishments in Hawaii
Japanese-American culture in Los Angeles
Japanese-American culture in California
Japanese-American culture in Hawaii
2013 mergers and acquisitions
American subsidiaries of foreign companies